This is a list of motorsport races held before 1906, which is regarded as the first Grand Prix racing season.

1894

1895

1896

1897

1898

1899

1900

1901

1902

1903

1904

1905

References

1900s
1890s in motorsport
1900s in motorsport
Motorsport in Europe